Carice Anouk van Houten is a Dutch actress and singer (born 5 September 1976 in Leiderdorp). Her first leading role in the television film Suzy Q (1999) won her the Golden Calf for Best Acting in a Television Drama; two years later, she won the Golden Calf for Best Actress for Miss Minoes (2001).

She gained widespread recognition for her performance in Black Book (2006), the most commercially successful Dutch film to date, for which she won her second Golden Calf for Best Actress, in addition to nominations from the Chicago Film Critics Association, the European Film Academy, and the Online Film Critics Society. She was nominated for a Saturn Award for Best Supporting Actress for Valkyrie (2008), and won her fourth and fifth Golden Calf Awards for Best Actress for The Happy Housewife (2010) and Black Butterflies (2011). Her other notable English-language performances include Repo Men (2010), Black Death (2010), and Brimstone (2016).

Van Houten received international recognition for her role as Melisandre on the HBO television series Game of Thrones (2012–2019), for which she received nominations for two Screen Actors Guild Awards for Outstanding Performance by an Ensemble in a Drama Series and a Primetime Emmy Award for Outstanding Guest Actress in a Drama Series.

Early life
Van Houten was brought up watching silent films and in an interview she professed to prefer playing scenes without dialogue. She has a younger sister, Jelka van Houten, who is also an actress. Her paternal grandmother was Scottish. Van Houten went to the St. Bonifatiuscollege (high school) in Utrecht, where she played the leading role in Hugo Claus' Tijl Uilenspieghel, directed by Ad Migchielsen. Van Houten studied briefly at the Maastricht Academy of Dramatic Arts but continued her professional education after one year at the Kleinkunstacademie in Amsterdam.

Acting career

Van Houten played her first leading role in Martin Koolhoven's TV film Suzy Q. She won a Golden Calf for her part as Suzy. She also won the Pisuisse Award and the Top Naeff Award for her stage acting and another Golden Calf for her part as the kitten that becomes a woman in Miss Minoes (2001). The first time she could be seen in cinemas in the U.S. was when Martin Koolhoven's AmnesiA (2001) got a small theatrical release.

Van Houten won a Golden Calf for her performance as Rachel Stein in Black Book (2006) at the Netherlands Film Festival. Black Books director Paul Verhoeven said about her in a television interview: "Never in my life I have worked with an actress this talented", and when asked to compare her with Sharon Stone he said "Carice can really act." The international press was also enthusiastic about her role in Black Book.

In December 2006, Van Houten withdrew from a theatre production of Alex van Warmerdam due to personal reasons. According to a theatre spokesman it was because of a work overload.

In 2008, she starred in the non-commercial short movie Zingen in het donker (English: Singing in the dark), a drama on domestic violence. She appeared in the magazine Vanity Fair in the issue for March 2008, photographed by Wayne Maser. In 2008, Van Houten had a role opposite Leonardo DiCaprio in Body of Lies but her scenes did not make the final cut of the movie.

In April 2009, it was announced that Van Houten would star in Black Death by British director Christopher Smith and in the Dutch film Komt een vrouw bij de dokter (English title: Stricken), based on the novel of the same name by Ray Kluun. She also starred in the science fiction thriller Repo Men.

In July 2011, Van Houten was cast as the priestess Melisandre in the second season of HBO's fantasy TV series Game of Thrones. Her performance has garnered her praise and recognition, earning her a Primetime Emmy Award nomination for Outstanding Guest Actress in a Drama Series for her final performance as the character in the season 8 episode "The Long Night" in 2019. After nominations were announced for the ceremony, Van Houten received considerable media attention for having been one of the three nominated actors from the show to have self-submitted and paid entry fees to be on the ballot for Emmy consideration after HBO had not done so for them. She has also received three Screen Actors Guild Award nominations for Outstanding Performance by an Ensemble in a Drama Series in 2014, 2016, and 2017 for the role.

In 2012, Van Houten appeared in Antony and the Johnsons' "Cut the world" video, which was directed by Nabil Elderkin and also starred Willem Dafoe and Marina Abramović.

In 2019, Van Houten starred as a prison therapist that becomes infatuated with one of her patients, a serial rapist, in Halina Reijn’s directorial debut Instinct. The film premiered at the Locarno Film Festival, receiving the Variety Piazza Grande Award and was selected as the Dutch submission for Best International Feature Film at the 92nd Academy Awards. Variety’s Guy Lodge described Van Houten as being "on electrifying form" and Reijn's direction "provides a fearsome reminder" of the former's breakthrough performance in Black Book.

Personal life
Van Houten is in a relationship with Australian actor Guy Pearce, whom she met on the set of Brimstone. In August 2016, she gave birth to their son, Monte Pearce. She previously dated German actor Sebastian Koch; they met on the set of the 2006 film Black Book.

Van Houten speaks Dutch, English, German, and French.

Van Houten has stated that Hollywood makes her unhappy: "I have seen Hollywood, and although I have nothing against it, it's not my kind of life. My agent is shocked that I want to stay in Europe," adding, "If Hollywood offers me a great part, of course I'll take it, but I just don't want to live there".

Van Houten has been friends with fellow Dutch actress Halina Reijn since 1994. They worked together in the movies Black Book and Valkyrie. In 2013, the two published a book called Anti Glamour, a parody style guide and a celebration of their friendship, as well as a candid look into the unglamourous back-stage side of their lives.

Van Houten is a lifelong fan of Laurel and Hardy. In June 2016, she called into The Ross Owen Show on Black Sky Radio to talk about her love of the comedy duo.

Filmography

Television

Discography
 Black Book (soundtrack) (2007) – vocals on four songs
 See You on the Ice (2012)
 "Fear Not" (2015) – featuring Michael Prins
 Bobbie Gentry's The Delta Sweete Revisited (2019) by Mercury Rev - vocals on 'Parchman Farm'
 Once Upon a Time in Shaolin (2015) by Wu-Tang Clan

Awards and nominations

References

External links

Carice van Houten at Virtual History

20th-century Dutch actresses
21st-century Dutch actresses
Dutch film actresses
Dutch stage actresses
Dutch television actresses
Dutch people of Scottish descent
EMI Records artists
Golden Calf winners
Living people
People from Leiderdorp
21st-century Dutch singers
21st-century Dutch women singers
1976 births